William Boyce may refer to:

William Boyce (composer) (1711–1779), English-born composer and Master of the King's Musick
William Binnington Boyce (1804–1889), English-born philologist and clergyman, active in Australia
William Waters Boyce (1818–1890), U.S. Confederate congressional delegate
William H. Boyce (1855–1942), jurist and U.S. representative from Delaware
William D. Boyce (1858–1929), founder of the Boy Scouts of America

See also
Billy Boyce (1927–2011), Australian boxer
William Boyce Thompson (1869–1930), American mining engineer and financier